Ramokokastad is a rural town in the North West Province of South Africa. It is near Rustenburg and about 1–2 hours' drive away from Johannesburg.

It comprises four sub villages namely: Phadi, Mmorogong, Bojating and Phalane. Other villages which are far from the main village are Mantserre, Phalane o monye and Tlaseng. The village is about 70 km from Mogwase and about 30 km from Northam. The village is just at the border of Limpopo and other farms belonging to the village are in Limpopo Province.

References

Populated places in the Moses Kotane Local Municipality